After Midnight  is a 2004 Italian romantic comedy film directed by Davide Ferrario. It entered the Forum section at the 54th Berlin International Film Festival, in which Ferrario won the Caligari Film Prize and the Don Quixote Award.

Cast 
 Giorgio Pasotti as Martino
 Francesca Inaudi as Amanda
  as The Angel of Falchera 
 Francesca Picozza as Barbara
 Silvio Orlando as Narrator
 Pietro Eandi as Martino's Grandfather
 Andrea Romero as Fast Food Owner
 Giampiero Perone as Bruno the Night Watchman
 Francesco D'Alessio as Member of the Falchera's Gang
 Gianni Talia as Member of the Falchera's Gang
 Andrea Moretti as Member of the Falchera's Gang
 Gianna Cavalla as The Car Receiver
 Claudio Pagano as The Car Receiver's Bodyguard

See also 
 List of Italian films of 2004

References

External links

2004 films
Films set in Turin
Films set in Italy
Italian romantic comedy films
2004 romantic comedy films
Films directed by Davide Ferrario
2000s Italian-language films
2000s Italian films